The 2011 Oberstaufen Cup was a professional tennis tournament played on clay courts. It was part of the 2011 ATP Challenger Tour. It was the 20th edition of the tournament. It took place in Oberstaufen, Germany between July 4 and July 10, 2011.

ATP entrants

Seeds

 1 Rankings are as of June 20, 2011.

Other entrants
The following players received wildcards into the singles main draw:
  Dieter Kindlmann
  Kevin Krawietz
  Borut Puc
  Marcel Zimmermann

The following players received entry from the qualifying draw:
  Kamil Čapkovič
  Tiago Fernandes
  Leonardo Kirche
  Gabriel Trujillo Soler

The following player received entry into the singles main draw as a lucky loser:
  André Ghem

Champions

Men's singles

 Daniel Brands def.  Andreas Beck, 6–4, 7–6(7–3)

Men's doubles

 Martin Fischer /  Philipp Oswald def.  Tomasz Bednarek /  Mateusz Kowalczyk, 7–6(7–1), 6–3

External links
Official Website
ITF Search 
ATP official site

Oberstaufen Cup
Clay court tennis tournaments
Oberstaufen Cup
2011 in German tennis